The Campbell shag (Leucocarbo campbelli), also known as the Campbell Island shag, is a species of bird in the family Phalacrocoracidae.  It is endemic to Campbell Island.  Its natural habitats are open seas and rocky shores. It is a medium-sized bird, around 63 cm in length, with a wingspan of 105 cm, weighing between 1.6 – 2 kg. They only breed on Campbell Island and forage within 10 km of the island. Its unique, looped head and elongated beak allows to easily feed on shellfish and marine invertebrates. This is done through foraging dive cycles of high speed and efficiency.  

Some taxonomic authorities, including the International Ornithologists' Union, place this species in the genus Leucocarbo. Others place it in the genus Phalacrocorax.

References

External links
Species factsheet - BirdLife International

Campbell shag
Birds of the Campbell Islands
Campbell shag
Campbell shag
Taxonomy articles created by Polbot
Endemic birds of New Zealand